Pimpimbudgee is a rural locality in the South Burnett Region, Queensland, Australia. In the  Pimpimbudgee had a population of 72 people.

History 
Peron State School  opened on 1 April 1914. In 1934 it was moved to the foot of the Maidenwell Range and was then known as Maidenwell State School. It closed on 18 March 1938. In 1949 the school was relocated to its current location in Pimpimbudgee and renamed Tanduringie State School.

Maidenwell Provisional School opened on 24 January 1921. On 16 May 1923 it became Maidenwell State School. In 1923 it was renamed Pimpimbudgee State School. It closed on 29 July 1946.

In the  Pimpimbudgee had a population of 72 people.

Education 
Tanduringie State School is a government primary (Prep-6) school for boys and girls at 32 Tanduringie School Road. In 2018, the school had an enrolment of 38 students with 4 teachers (2 full-time equivalent) and 5 non-teaching staff (3 full-time equivalent).

The nearest secondary school is Yarraman State School in Yarraman to the north-east which offers secondary education to Year 9. For secondary education to Year 12 the nearest school is Nanango State High School in Nanango to the north-east.

References 

South Burnett Region
Localities in Queensland